Barilius gatensis is a fish in genus Barilius of the family Cyprinidae.

References 

G
Fish described in 1844